Defiance is an unincorporated community and census-designated place in Saint Charles County, Missouri, United States. As of the 2020 census, the population was 159.

History 
Defiance was struck hard in the Tornado outbreak of December 10–11, 2021 by a tornado rated EF3. One person was killed.

Situation

The Katy Trail State Park runs through Defiance near the Missouri River. This was the final home of frontiersman Daniel Boone, who settled in the Femme Osage Valley in 1799 after receiving a Spanish land grant. The hamlet was not named during Boone's life.

The Daniel Boone Home, Daniel Boone Hays House, and Isaac McCormick House are listed on the National Register of Historic Places. The Wolf-Ruebeling House is formerly listed.

Etymology
The community was named in the late 1800s when the Katy Railroad arrived. Initially, the town was to be called Parsons, after the landowner.  Because there was already a Parsons, Kansas on the Katy line, settlers considered other names, including Missouriton and Bluff City, before deciding on Defiance because of the hamlet's defiance of rival Matson to get a station on the line.

Characteristics
From here west to Marthasville are numerous wineries; SH 94 is sometimes called the "Missouri Weinstrasse".  The area is part of the Missouri Rhineland, where vineyards are cultivated on both sides of the Missouri River. Started originally by German immigrants, the wine industry also was shaped by later Italian immigrants.

In popular culture
Defiance was used as the name for the new settlement on top of the ruins of St. Louis, Missouri, in the television series of the same name. The series was produced by Universal Cable Productions, in transmedia collaboration with Trion Worlds who have released an MMORPG video game of the same name that is tied into the series world and mythology (but did not take place in the titular city).

Education
Defiance is covered by the Francis Howell School District with a small portion of the CDP attending the School District of Washington. Most students attend Daniel Boone Elementary School in nearby New Melle, Missouri, Francis Howell Middle School in Weldon Spring, Missouri and Francis Howell High School.

See also 
Missouri Rhineland
Defiance (TV series)
Defiance (video game)

References

Missouri Rhineland
Unincorporated communities in St. Charles County, Missouri
Missouri populated places on the Missouri River
Unincorporated communities in Missouri
Census-designated places in Missouri